Valledolmo ("Valley of [the] Elm") is a  (municipality) in the Metropolitan City of Palermo in the Italian region of Sicily, located about  southeast of Palermo.  
Valledolmo borders the following municipalities: Alia, Sclafani Bagni, Vallelunga Pratameno.

References

External links
 Official website
 Valledolmo Genealogical Resources independent website focussed on nineteenth- and early twentieth-century genealogy

Cities and towns in Sicily